Hasan Qoli Khan (also Romanized as Ḩasan Qolī Khān) is a village in Dodangeh Rural District, in the Central District of Behbahan County, Khuzestan Province, Iran. At the 2006 census, its population was 45, in 9 families.

References 

Populated places in Behbahan County